The 1993–94 NCAA Division I men's basketball season concluded in the 64-team 1994 NCAA Division I men's basketball tournament whose finals were held at the Charlotte Coliseum in Charlotte, North Carolina. The Arkansas Razorbacks earned their first national championship by defeating the Duke Blue Devils 76–72 on April 4, 1994. They were coached by Nolan Richardson and the NCAA basketball tournament Most Outstanding Player was Arkansas' Corliss Williamson.

In the 32-team 1994 National Invitation Tournament, the Villanova Wildcats defeated the Vanderbilt Commodores at Madison Square Garden in New York City.

Following the season, the 1994 NCAA Men's Basketball All-American Consensus First team included Grant Hill, Jason Kidd, Donyell Marshall, Glenn Robinson, and Clifford Rozier.

Season headlines 
 Nolan Richardson led the Arkansas Razorbacks to their first National Championship, also his first.

Major rule changes 
Beginning in 1993–94, the following rules changes were implemented:
 The shot clock was shortened from 45 seconds to 35 seconds per possession

Pre-season polls 
The top 25 from the pre-season AP and Coaches Polls.

Conference membership changes 

These schools joined new conferences for the 1993–94 season.

Regular season

Conference winners and tournaments 
30 conference seasons concluded with a single-elimination tournament, with only the Big Ten Conference, Ivy League and the Pac-10 Conference choosing not to conduct conference tournaments. Conference tournament winners, with the exception of the East Coast Conference, received an automatic bid to the NCAA tournament.

Statistical leaders

Post-season tournaments

NCAA tournament

Final Four – Charlotte Coliseum, Charlotte, North Carolina

National Invitation tournament

Semifinals & finals 

 Third Place - Siena 92, Kansas State 79

Award winners

Consensus All-American teams

Major player of the year awards 
 Wooden Award: Glenn Robinson, Purdue
 Naismith Award: Glenn Robinson, Purdue
 Associated Press Player of the Year: Glenn Robinson, Purdue
 NABC Player of the Year: Glenn Robinson, Purdue
 Oscar Robertson Trophy (USBWA): Glenn Robinson, Purdue
 Adolph Rupp Trophy: Glenn Robinson, Purdue
 Sporting News Player of the Year: Glenn Robinson, Purdue
 UPI College Basketball Player of the Year: Glenn Robinson, Purdue

Major freshman of the year awards 
 USBWA Freshman of the Year: Joe Smith, Maryland

Major coach of the year awards 
 Associated Press Coach of the Year: Norm Stewart, Missouri
 Henry Iba Award (USBWA): Charlie Spoonhour, Saint Louis
 NABC Coach of the Year: Gene Keady, Purdue & Nolan Richardson, Arkansas
 Naismith College Coach of the Year: Nolan Richardson, Arkansas
 Sporting News Coach of the Year: Norm Stewart, Missouri

Other major awards 
 NABC Defensive Player of the Year: Jim McIlvaine, Marquette
 Frances Pomeroy Naismith Award (Best player under 6'0): Greg Brown, New Mexico
 Robert V. Geasey Trophy (Top player in Philadelphia Big 5): Eddie Jones, Temple
 NIT/Haggerty Award (Top player in New York City metro area): Izett Buchanan, Marist & Artūras Karnišovas, Seton Hall

References